The Château de la Fleunie is a château located south of the commune of Condat-sur-Vézère in Dordogne, Nouvelle-Aquitaine, France.

History 

Built in the 12th century on the left bank of the Vézère, the Château de la Fleunie faces the Château de la Petite Filolie on the other bank.

The Château was used by the Knights Hospitallers and the Sovereign Military Order of Malta as a commandery house. After a restoration in 1990, it is today a luxury hotel-restaurant, known as Château La Fleunie.

References 

Châteaux in Dordogne
 Chateau De La Fleunie